The 1961 Tulane Green Wave football team was an American football team that represented Tulane University during the 1961 NCAA University Division football season as a member of the Southeastern Conference. In their eighth year under head coach Andy Pilney, the team compiled a 2–8 record.

Schedule

References

Tulane
Tulane Green Wave football seasons
Tulane Green Wave football